Masciago Primo is a comune (municipality) in the Province of Varese in the Italian region Lombardy, located about 60 km northwest of Milan and about 12 km northwest of Varese. As of 31 December 2004, it had a population of 289 and an area of 1.9 km².

The municipality of Masciago Primo contains the frazioni (subdivisions, mainly villages and hamlets) Località Mondada and Località Muniscione.

Masciago Primo borders the following municipalities: Bedero Valcuvia, Cunardo, Ferrera di Varese, Rancio Valcuvia.

Demographic evolution

References

External links
 www.comunedimasciagoprimo.net

Cities and towns in Lombardy